Tampere camp (also Kalevankangas camp) was a concentration camp operating from 6 April 1918 to 15 September 1918 in the Kaleva district of Tampere, Finland. It was set up for the Reds captured by the White Army after the Finnish Civil War Battle of Tampere.

History 
Tampere camp was established on 6 April 1918 as the Battle of Tampere was over and the Whites captured approximately 11,000 Red Guard members. Hundreds of Reds were executed right after the capitulation but as the number of prisoners increased, the Whites decided to set up a concentration camp to the former Russian Army garrison in the Kalevankangas heath. The captured Reds were first gathered to the Central Square and then marched to the camp located 2 kilometres east of the town. Some of the prisoners were first held at local schools and other public buildings, by the end of May they were all transported to the Tampere camp. The camp was composed of 21 military barracks and several other buildings. The area was surrounded by barbed wire and the guarded by machine guns.

Tampere camp was run by the Finnish Army until 15 September 1918 when it was turned into a forced labor camp under the jurisdiction of the National Prison Agency and most of the prisoners were released to await their trial. The camp was finally closed in early 1919 and the remaining prisoners moved to the Tammisaari prison camp.

The total number of prisoners in the Tampere camp is estimated 10,000. The number was at its highest in the end of June when there were about 7,700 prisoners. Detainees included hundreds of women and up to 80 children. 1,200–1,400 died of executions, disease or malnutrition. The youngest victim was the 9-year-old boy Wilho Kuusijärvi, who was shot in May.

Memorial 
The victims were buried to a mass grave in the nearby Kalevankangas Cemetery. The total number of bodies in the grave is approximately 2,700, including the Red Guard fighters killed in the Battle of Tampere. The memorial was erected in 1941. It is a work of the sculptor Jussi Hietanen who was detained in the Tampere camp at the age of 15.

See also 
Finnish Civil War prison camps

References 

Prisoner-of-war camps
Finnish Civil War
Buildings and structures in Tampere
History of Pirkanmaa